Uta Rohländer, married Fromm (born 30 June 1969 in Merseburg) is a retired German sprinter who specialised in the 400 metres.

At the 1996 Summer Olympics in Atlanta, she won a bronze medal in the 4 × 400 metres relay with her teammates Linda Kisabaka, Anja Rücker and Grit Breuer.

At the 1997 World Championships in Athens, she won a gold medal in the 4 × 400 metres relay with her teammates Anke Feller, Rücker and Breuer.

Her personal best time is 50.33 seconds, achieved in July 1998 in Stuttgart.

She represented the sports club SV Halle. She married Alexander Fromm, son of Dieter Fromm.

Achievements 

Note: Results in parenthesis indicate overall position in that round

References 
 

1969 births
Living people
People from Merseburg
German female sprinters
German national athletics champions
Athletes (track and field) at the 1992 Summer Olympics
Athletes (track and field) at the 1996 Summer Olympics
Olympic athletes of Germany
Olympic bronze medalists for Germany
World Athletics Championships medalists
European Athletics Championships medalists
World Athletics Championships athletes for Germany
East German female sprinters
Sportspeople from Saxony-Anhalt
Olympic bronze medalists in athletics (track and field)
World Athletics Championships winners
Medalists at the 1996 Summer Olympics
Competitors at the 1995 Summer Universiade
Olympic female sprinters